Miles McMullan (born 1 August 1967 in Bangor) is an author, conservationist and naturalist from Northern Ireland, who has made innovative books on neotropical wildlife.

Early Life 
McMullan studied at Our Lady and St. Patrick's College, Ulster University and Trinity College, Dublin. He worked as a prize-winning landscape and portrait painter in his early years. He qualified as an editor and worked for several years writing academic texts before concentrating in the wildlife field guides that he has made since 2008.

Career as an Author 
McMullan has specialised in making nature guidebooks for the most diverse countries of tropical South American countries including Venezuela, Colombia and Ecuador, where he has also worked as a naturalist guide, birding tourguide and author. His influential guide to the birds of Colombia was named second best bird book of 2010, second only to the acclaimed Collins Birds of Europe, and Neotropical Bird Club named his guides among the 25 best books of the past 25 years, noting their concise treatment of very large avifaunas. 

His Colombia book, with over 5000 illustrations and 2000 range distribution maps has been described as among the largest books ever made by a single author/illustrator. His books marked a divergence from the style used in previous national guidebooks.

Titles 
His titles include Field Guide to the Birds of Colombia (with Thomas Donegan) (2010, updates in 2014 and 2018), Fieldbook of the Birds of Ecuador (with Lelis Navarrete) (2013, updated 2017), Field Guide to the Hummingbirds (2016), Field Guide to the Galapagos Islands (2017), Birds of the Colombian Andes (2019), Birds of Meta and the Colombian Llanos (2019), Birds of the Western Cordillera (2019), Birds and Common Mammals of Ecuadorian Amazon (with Andrés Vásquez) (2012), Birds of Northwest Ecuador (with Andrés Vásquez) and many other titles such as regional and reserve guides. He has published many smaller guidebooks and has spoken of the importance of smaller local guidebooks and pamphlets in developing a strong rural economy that supports conservation and ecology.  

Additionally, he has been author or co-author of several research papers, magazine and journal articles. His illustrations have appeared in several other books, articles, publications, including forming part of the natural history collection of the Luis Angel Arango Library of the National Bank of Colombia.

Conservation and Other Work 
McMullan has worked with a number of conservation organizations and foundations, especially in bird conservation in the tropical Americas. He is a devoted environmentalist and advocate of low-impact wildlife-watching - he has spoken in favor of more local birding as a more sustainable alternative, and voiced concerns about the impacts of the travel involved in global birding.  He is involved with indigenous communities such as the Awá of southwestern Colombia and the conservation of their lands and is an active campaigner and donor in the battle to combat climate change. 

In August 2022 he received a special recognition of his work with women's groups in rural Colombia from the Ministry of Science of Colombia. 

He is a regular speaker at birding and conservation fairs and conferences, occasional exhibitor of his paintings and has appeared on television programs broadcast in UK, Spain, Australia and Colombia, where programs have been made exclusively about his work. 

He currently lives in Pasto, Colombia.

Books by Miles McMullan 

 Field Guide to the Birds of Colombia (2010, 2014, 2018)
 Guia de Campo de Las Aves de Colombia (2011, 2021)
 Fieldbook of the Birds of Ecuador (2013, 2017)
 Field Guide to the Hummingbirds (2016)
 Field Guide to the Galapagos Islands (2017)
 Birds of the Colombian Andes (2019)
 Birds of Meta and the Colombian Llanos (2019)
 Birds of the Western Cordillera (2019)
 Birds and Common Mammals of Ecuadorian Amazon (2012)
 Birds of Northwest Ecuador (2009)

References 

Writers from Northern Ireland
People from Bangor, County Down
Illustrators from Northern Ireland
Ornithological handbooks
Ornithology
1967 births
Living people
British bird artists
Latin American writers
Ornithologists